Leo Patrick Devereaux O'Connor (11 April 1890 – 16 January 1985) was an Australian first-class cricketer who captained and kept wicket for Queensland in the Sheffield Shield.

He was the first person ever to captain Queensland at cricket and represent them in Australian rules football, a feat later replicated by Aub Carrigan. His son, Brian O'Connor, also played both cricket and football for Queensland.

Football
Prior to commencing his first class cricket career, O'Connor played briefly with Australian rules football club Essendon in the VFL.

Cricket
He made his first appearance for Queensland in 1913 and was a regular for the state whenever they played a first class match over the following decade and a half. When Queensland made their Sheffield Shield debut in 1926-27 O'Connor was named as their inaugural captain.

Their first game was against New South Wales at Brisbane and with Queensland set 400 to win in the 4th innings he opened the batting and made 196 before being run out. He had been the last wicket to fall and Queensland fell just 8 runs short of the target.

Queensland travelled to Sydney the following week to play their away fixture and O'Connor scored a century in both innings, thus becoming the first Queenslander to do so in Shield history. It would be a good season for O'Connor with the bat, he finished with 731 runs at 66.45.

Notes

References
 Maplestone, M., Flying Higher: History of the Essendon Football Club 1872–1996, Essendon Football Club, (Melbourne), 1996.

External links

1890 births
1985 deaths
Australian rules footballers from Victoria (Australia)
Australian Rules footballers: place kick exponents
Essendon Football Club players
Australian cricketers
Queensland cricketers
Queensland cricket captains
Cricketers from Victoria (Australia)
Wicket-keepers